Cap Radio may refer to: 

Cap Radio (Morocco), a Morocco radio station.
Capital Public Radio, an American organization comprising 7 radio stations.